Kayda Kanoon (transl. Rules and Regulations) is a 1993 Indian action film directed by Pradeep Mani and produced by Suresh Sharma. It stars Akshay Kumar, Ashwini Bhave, Sudesh Berry, Paresh Rawal and Kader Khan.

Cast
Akshay Kumar as Inspector Dawood Durrani
Ashwini Bhave as Shehnaz Lucknowi / Maria D'Souza
Sudesh Berry as Inspector Kishan Kashyap
Tinu Anand as Ranganathan
Paresh Rawal as MP Kalika Prasad
Anupam Kher as Sinha
Aruna Irani as MLA Vimla Sinha
Kader Khan as Mirza Lucknowi
Ajit Vachani as Amrit Sinha
Anant Mahadevan as Kashyap
Arun Bali
Pankaj Berry
Pradeep Rawat as Inspector Deshmukh
Shikha Swaroop as Kavita Sinha
Harbans Darshan M. Arora as Judge

Soundtrack

References

External links
 

1993 films
1990s Hindi-language films
Films scored by Anand–Milind
Indian action drama films